The Eastern Trunk line is a railway line of the Taiwan Railways Administration running along Taiwan's sparsely populated eastern corridor.

The Eastern Trunk line is a combination of line sections:

Notes

References

TRA routes
3 ft 6 in gauge railways in Taiwan